The Ministry of Health is a ministry responsible for providing healthcare to the citizens of Somalia.

History
Although this ministry has existed since independence a new iteration of this ministry was formed in 2012 at the formation of the federal government. The earliest Somali health minister was [] /ref> In 2018, services began being expanded to regions such as Benadir. The current Minister of Health is Fowsiya Nur.

See also
 Healthcare in Somalia
 Agriculture in Somalia

References

Government ministries of Somalia